Peter Campbell (1 April 1938) is a former Australian rules footballer who played with Geelong in the Victorian Football League (VFL).		
		
A centre half-forward originally from Lorne, Victoria, he made his debut during the 1958 VFL season.

Notes

External links 		
				

	
		
		
		
1938 births		
Living people		
Australian rules footballers from Victoria (Australia)		
Geelong Football Club players